Sing Sing (1984–1994) is a compilation album by noise rock band The Honeymoon Killers, released on January 14, 1997 by Sympathy for the Record Industry. It compiles various live, rehearsal and living room recordings from the ten years the band was active.

Track listing

Personnel 
Adapted from the Sing Sing (1984-1994) liner notes.

The Honeymoon Killers
 Sally Edroso
 Claire Lawrence-Slater
 Cristina Martinez
 Michael O'Neal
 Russell Simins
 Jon Spencer
 Jerry Teel
 Lisa Wells

Additional musicians
 Judah Bauer
 Josh Curtis
 Dan Kroha
 Marcellus Hall
 Sandra Hamburg
 Kurt Hoffman
 Tony Lee
 John Linnell
 Frank London
 Billy Loose
 Jack Martin
 Hollis Queens
 Justin Williams

Release history

References

External links 
 Sing Sing (1984-1994) at Discogs (list of releases)

1997 compilation albums
The Honeymoon Killers (American band) albums
Sympathy for the Record Industry albums